The 1964 Copa de Campeones de América was the fifth edition of South America's premier club football tournament. For the first time since its inception, every member of CONMEBOL was represented in the competition. Deportivo Italia became the first club from Venezuela to participate, providing an unexpectedly impressive performance after eliminating Bahia of Brazil in the preliminary round and beating Barcelona in Guayaquil.

Building up on Boca Juniors's great showing in the last season, Argentine football managed to put themselves on the international map as Independiente won Argentina's first title. El Diablo Rojo, or Red Devil, eliminated the powerful Santos,  which played without the main stars of its attack (Dorval, Mengálvio, Coutinho and an injured Pelé didn't play, and Pepe played just the first match of the semifinal). After winning both matches of their semifinal series the Argentines dispatched Nacional in the finals. Mario Rodríguez was a key factor in Independiente's triumph and he became the top scorer of the tournament with 6 goals.

Qualified teams

Tie-breaking criteria
This edition saw a first round, with three groups containing three teams each; the preliminary round from the 1961 edition was reintroduced. The format for the semifinals and the finals remained unchanged.

At each stage of the tournament teams receive 2 points for a win, 1 point for a draw, and no points for a loss. If two or more teams are equal on points, the following criteria will be applied to determine the ranking in the group stage:

a one-game playoff;
superior goal difference;
draw of lots.

Preliminary round
Owing to the uneven number of teams in the competition, a preliminary round was created to determine who joined the other 9 teams in the competition. As a predominated "weak" side, Venezuela has its representative face off against Brazil's second representative. The winner of the series would advance into the First round. Both matches took place in Caracas.

First round
Nine teams were drawn into groups of three. In each group, teams played against each other home-and-away. The top team in each group advanced to the Semifinals. Santos, the title holders, had a bye to the next round.

Group 1

Group 2

Group 3

Semifinals
Four teams were drawn into two groups. In each group, teams played against each other home-and-away. The top team in each group advanced to the Finals.

Group A

Group B

Finals

Champion

Top goalscorers

Footnotes

A. Played in Avellaneda (Racing Club's stadium) due to the tragedy around the olympic qualifier between Peru and Argentina in Lima.
B. Played in Bogotá (El Campin) due to the tragedy around the olympic qualifier between Peru and Argentina in Lima.
C. Not played due to differences between CONMEBOL and the Colombian football federations, ADEFútbol and FEDEBOL (after Independiente refused to travel to Bogotá); points incredibly were awarded to Independiente despite refused to play (but no goals).

External links
Copa Libertadores 1964 at CONMEBOL website
Copa Libertadores 1964 at RSSSF

1
Copa Libertadores seasons